SA TV, the acronym of the lesser known South Asian Television, is a Bangladeshi Bengali-language satellite and cable television channel based in Gulshan, Dhaka. It is owned by the SA Group, one of Bangladesh's largest transportation and real estate groups. SA TV commenced transmissions on 19 January 2013, and is based in Gulshan, Dhaka.

History 
SA TV received its broadcasting license from the Bangladesh Telecommunication Regulatory Commission in April 2010. It commenced test transmissions on 20 April 2012, and later began official transmissions on 19 January 2013. Veteran film-maker Syed Salahuddin Zaki was the first chief operating officer of the channel and Scott Robert Craig was the first head of news.

SA TV won an International Quality Crown Award in 2015. In December 2016, Bangladeshi television professionals demanded SATV and three other local television channels to take dubbed foreign television series, which have gained popularity in the country, off their schedules. On 21 May 2021, SA TV, along with Channel 9, was obliged to temporarily cease operations over unpaid satellite transponder fees, according to authorities.

Programming
SA TV's programming line consists of newscasts, talk shows, dramas, national and international sports, music, movies and programming regarding health, fashion and lifestyle. It is also well known for the Bangladeshi adaptation the Idol franchise, Bangladeshi Idol, which premiered in 2013.

List of programming
 Anandogram
 Bangladeshi Idol
 Bela Sheshe
 Chayer Cup-e Jhor
 Chup Kotha
 Come to the Point
 Crime File
 Face
 Ghorar Chal Arai Ghor
 Joiboti Konyar Mon
 Jonotar Samne Jonoprotinidhi
 Mathe Moydane
 Parampara
 Prophet Joseph (title localized as Yusuf Zulekha)
 Shine In
 Tune And Count

References

External links
 

Television channels in Bangladesh
Mass media in Dhaka
Television channels and stations established in 2013
2013 establishments in Bangladesh